Keepers: The Key Of Life aka Guardians: The Key To Life (Хранители: Ключ Жизни) is a 2006 Russian video game by FalcorMedia, built by an internal gaming engine.

Presented at the KRI 2006, it is a three-dimensional game with anime-style graphics. The game features a branching narrative based on the player's choices.  The developers noted that the same outcomes can be achieved in multiple ways, depending on the player's perspective.

Plot 
The game takes place on the island of Idyll where there exists the Key to Life.

Development and release 
The game was created by the Moscow-based start-up FalcorMedia. As of April 2006, the developers were in talks with publishers and planning publication for the third quarter of that year. By April 16, the developers had not yet found a publisher but were optimistic. The game was released on April 12, 2007.

In November 2006, the developer presented the game at the Igromir exhibition.

After the release of the game, the developers planned to release a book based on the events of the game.

Critical reception 
Megaobzor felt the developers were inspired by Miyozaki. Igromania commented on the game's "vibrant" designs and simple puzzles. Ranma Spb thought parents would like the unusual plot. Absolute Games gave the title an "awful" rating.

External links 

 FalcorMedia main page
 Keepers game

References 

2006 video games